Émilie Tran Nguyen (born 27 March 1985) is a French journalist who works for France Télévisions. She began working as an intern in Paris at firms such as Clarins and in the legal department at TF1 before becoming a freelancer journalist in Clermont-Ferrand. She has been a presenter of the  news bulletin on France 3 since 2016.

Biography
On 27 March 1985, Nguyen was born in Marseille. Her father comes from Vietnam and is the owner of a small restaurant while her mother is from Algeria. Nguyen has two siblings and all three were raised to be encouraged to study and to strive for their goals. When she was three years old, the family moved to Clermont-Ferrand from La Canebière. Nguyen had considered becoming a paediatrician before she fainted from seeing blood and decided not to be a business manager due to her lack of business knowledge.

She began her working career as an intern in Paris at firms such as Clarins and in the legal department at TF1. After that, Nguyen was offered a permanent contract to work at Eurosport in its sales department managing advertising for the African, European and the Middle Eastern zones, which she rejected because she did not have the enthusiasm for the job. She returned to Clermont-Ferrand, and she commenced her career in journalism working as an freelancer at the Zap magazine and then as an intern for the local daily La Montagne newspaper in order to repay her student loans. Nguyen went on a two-year apprenticeship with France 3 at Soir 3 after a previous attempt was rejected and was mentored by editors-in-chief Arnauld Miguet and Jean-Jacques Basier. She was inspired by the likes of journalists Claire Chazal, Christine Ockrent and Anne Sinclair.

Nguyen was employed by the Groupe Canal+ on a work-study contract to work as a freelancer at the private continuous news channel iTélé in early 2014. She also had work at France 3 Centre some time later to make up the lack of on-screen work, and did some journalism work for the programme Télématin.

In July 2017, she became a columnist for the Saturday access programme  broadcast on France 5 for the upcoming television season. Nguyen became the co-presenter with Éric Fottorino of the Wednesday evening France Info programme Ouvrez le 1 in January 2019. She replaced  as the news presenter of the news summary segment 5 sur 5 on the night time programme C à vous in July 2020.

Nguyen participated in the #AsiatiquesDeFrance campaign in March 2017, denouncing clichés of the Asian community in France that stem from people's childhood. She was am ambassador for the 2021 class of La Chance, the journalism school competition for scholarship students that has the objective to improving social and ethnic representation of society in the media.

Personal life
She has been married to the columnist and journalist Maxime Darquier since July 2018. They have two children. Nguyen does not disclose aspects of her private life, and was racially abused for being of Asian descent when she was a child.

References

External links
 

1985 births
Living people
Mass media people from Marseille
French people of Algerian descent
French people of Vietnamese descent
20th-century French women
21st-century French women
French women journalists
French women television presenters
French television journalists